Events from the year 1657 in art.

Events
July - The outbreak of plague in Genoa reaches its height; it results in the deaths of many artists, as well as both the parents of 19-year-old painter Giovanni Battista Gaulli and two of the three sons of Luciano Borzone.
Nicolaes van Verendael becomes a member of the Guild of St Luke at Antwerp.

Paintings

 Nicolaes Maes – Portrait of Four Children
 Nicolas Poussin – The Flight into Egypt
 Salomon van Ruysdael – View of Deventer Seen from the North-West
 Diego Velázquez – Las Hilanderas (c.1657)
 Jan Vermeer – A Girl Asleep

Births
January - Pieter van Bloemen, Flemish painter (died 1720)
May 8 – Martino Altomonte, Italian painter of frescoes (died 1745)
October 4 - Francesco Solimena, Italian painter and draughtsman (died 1747)
October 8 - Wigerus Vitringa, Dutch seascape painter (died 1725)
date unknown
Gioseffo Maria Bartolini, Italian painter (died 1725)
Michiel Carree, Dutch painter (died 1727)
Louis de Boullogne, French painter and brother of Bon Boullogne (died 1733)
Giovanni Evangelista Draghi, Italian painter (died 1712)
Gregorio Lazzarini, Italian painter of religious, historical and mythological subjects  (died 1730)
Pârvu Mutul, Romanian muralist and church painter (died 1735)
Giuseppe Nicola Nasini, Italian painter of frescoes, director of Grand-Ducal Academy for the Arts (died 1736)
Joseph Vivien, French painter (died 1735)

Deaths
February 7 - Cesare Dandini, Italian painter (born 1596)
February 19 - Evert van Aelst, Dutch still life painter (born 1602)
March 7 - Balthasar van der Ast, Dutch Golden Age painter who specialized in still lifes of flowers and fruit (born 1593/1594)
April 29 - Jacques Stella, French painter (born 1596)
June - Jan Antonisz van Ravesteyn, Dutch painter to the Dutch court in The Hague (born 1572)
July - Luigi Baccio del Bianco, Italian architect, engineer, scenic designer and painter (born 1604)
August 16 - Pieter Soutman, Dutch Golden Age painter (born 1580)
August 19 - Frans Snyders, Flemish still-life master, apprenticed to Pieter II Brueghel (born 1579)
September 13 - Jacob van Campen, Dutch artist and architect of the Golden Age (born 1597)
October 
David Bailly, Leiden artist (born 1584)
Hendrik Gerritsz Pot, Dutch painter (born 1580)
November 29 - Raffaello Vanni, Italian painter for churches of the Baroque period (born 1590)
date unknown
Bartholomeus Breenbergh, Dutch painter (born 1598)
Carlo Bozzoni, Italian painter of the Baroque period (born 1605)
Giovanni Paolo Oderico, Italian painter mainly active in Genoa (born 1613)
Clara Peeters, Flemish still life painter (born 1594)
Pieter van Schaeyenborgh, Dutch painter of fish still lifes (born 1600)
victims of the Genoa plague
Giuseppe Badaracco, Italian painter (born 1588)
Bartolomeo Biscaino, Italian painter, active in his native Genoa (born 1632)
Giovanni Andrea Biscaino (father of Bartolomeo), Italian painter of landscapes (date of birth unknown)
Silvestro Chiesa, Italian painter (b. unknown)
Giovanni Battista Mainero, Italian painter from Genoa (born 1600)
Francesco Merano, Italian painter mainly active in his native Genoa (born 1619)
Giovanni Battista Monti, Italian painter of portraits (date of birth unknown)
Giovanni Battista Primi, Italian marine landscapes and portrait painter (date of birth unknown)
Giovanni Stefano Verdura, Italian painter of the Baroque period, mainly active in Genoa (date of birth unknown)

 
Years of the 17th century in art
1650s in art